Robert D. Cope (July 17, 1928 – November 28, 2001) was an American college basketball player and coach from the University of Montana.

Cope grew up in Missoula, Montana. a 6'3" center, he played for Missoula County High School, where he led the team to the 1946 state title. He opted to stay close to home, attending the University of Montana and playing basketball from 1946 to 1950. Cope was an excellent scorer, finishing his career with 1,808 points and earning third-team All-American honors from the Helms Athletic Foundation in 1948.

Cope later turned to coaching, first at Southwestern College in California, until he resigned due to illness. He then moved to his alma mater, first as an assistant for five seasons, then as head coach from 1968 to 1970. He compiled a record of 13–34 in the two seasons. Cope died in Missoula on November 28, 2001.

Head coaching record

References

1928 births
2001 deaths
All-American college men's basketball players
American men's basketball coaches
American men's basketball players
Basketball coaches from Montana
Basketball players from Montana
Boston Celtics draft picks
College men's basketball head coaches in the United States
Junior college men's basketball coaches in the United States
Montana Grizzlies basketball coaches
Montana Grizzlies basketball players
Sportspeople from Missoula, Montana
Centers (basketball)